Ephraim Kirby (February 23, 1757 – October 4, 1804) was a Revolutionary War soldier, published the first volume of law reports in the United States, was the first General High Priest of the Royal Arch Masons of the United States, and was the first judge of the Superior Court of the Mississippi Territory.

Early life

Kirby was born in Woodbury, Connecticut, the son of Abraham Kirby and the great-great grandson of Joseph Kirby who emigrated from Warwickshire to Hartford, Connecticut in the early seventeenth century. Kirby attended Yale University but left college without a degree. He served in the cavalry during the American Revolution, seeing combat in the Battle of Bunker Hill and in the engagement at Elk River, he received seven sabre cuts on the head, and was left on the field as dead.  In all, he was wounded thirteen times rising to the rank of lieutenant in a Rhode Island company. Upon his return to Litchfield, Connecticut, he married Ruth Marvin, daughter of his legal mentor.

Career
Kirby practiced law in Litchfield, Connecticut and, in 1787, Yale gave him an honorary Master of Arts degree.  He served in the Connecticut General Assembly from 1791 until 1801. afterwards he was director of the Western Reserve in Ohio. 

In 1789 Kirby compiled the first volume of law reports in America, those of the Superior Court of Connecticut, in the Reports of Cases Adjudged in the Superior Court of the State of Connecticut, from the year 1785, to May, 1788. He was also the first General Grand High Priest of the Royal Arch Masons of the United States, 1798-1804.

President Thomas Jefferson appointed Kirby Supervisor of Internal Revenue for Connecticut, a position he held until September 1802. In April 1804, Kirby was appointed the first Superior Court Judge of the Mississippi Territory. He went directly to his new post, Fort Stoddert, on the Alabama River north of Spanish-held Mobile, near the present Mount Vernon. In this sparsely settled wilderness, he began the foundation of a new court system for what would become the State of Alabama.

He lived only a few months, dying of fever after being appointed by President Jefferson as the new Judge of the Superior Court of the Territory of Orleans. He left Ruth and eight children in Connecticut. His grave at old Fort Stoddert has never been found. He is buried in Morning Star Cemetery in Mount Vernon, Alabama.

Judge Kirby was the grandfather of Edmund Kirby Smith, the Confederate general.

References

External links
Bio

1757 births
1804 deaths
People from Woodbury, Connecticut
Members of the Connecticut House of Representatives
Justices of the Louisiana Supreme Court
Alabama lawyers
United States federal judges appointed by Thomas Jefferson
19th-century American judges
Connecticut Land Company
People of Connecticut in the American Revolution
People of colonial Connecticut